Trachyspina is a genus of spiders in the family Trachycosmidae. It was first described in 2002 by Platnick. , it contains 8 species, all from Australia.

Species
Trachyspina comprises the following species:
Trachyspina capensis Platnick, 2002
Trachyspina chillimookoo Platnick, 2002
Trachyspina daunton Platnick, 2002
Trachyspina goongarrie Platnick, 2002
Trachyspina illamurta Platnick, 2002
Trachyspina madura Platnick, 2002
Trachyspina mundaring Platnick, 2002
Trachyspina olary Platnick, 2002

References

Trochanteriidae
Araneomorphae genera
Spiders of Australia